Hodi (trans. Come) is the fourth studio album from Serbian rock band Van Gogh, released in 1996.

Track listing
"Put"  – 3:50
"Polje snova"  – 4:19
"Zamisli"  – 4:26
"Apsolutno ne"  – 3:18
"Delfin"  – 4:29
"Hodi"  – 3:38
"Godine (I ko se boji, ne postoji)"  – 4:19
"Tamo daleko"  – 4:04
"Kiselina"  – 3:43
"Klatno"  – 2:55
"SP & SP"  – 2:23

Bonus tracks
"Luna (Live)"  – 5:25
"Vertigo"  – 1:09

Personnel
Zvonimir Đukić - guitar, vocals
Aleksandar Barać - bass guitar
Srboljub Radivojević - drums

References 
 EX YU ROCK enciklopedija 1960-2006,  Janjatović Petar;  

1996 albums
Van Gogh (band) albums
PGP-RTS albums